Pius Coxwell Achanga is a management professional, industrial scientist and academic administrator in Uganda. From 4 October 2022, he serves as the substantive Vice Chancellor of the Mountains of the Moon University (MMU), the tenth public university in the country at that time. 

From 25 January 2019 until 4 October 2022, he served as the chairman of the four-person Task Force Committee, established by the Cabinet Minister of Education and Sports to superintend the transition of MMU from a private university to a public institution.

Background and education
Achanga is a Ugandan national. His first degree, a Bachelor of Business Information Technology (BBIT), was awarded by the University of Hull in the United Kingdom (UK). His degree of Master of Science (MSc), in Manufacturing Management and Information Systems, was obtained from the Cranfield University, also in the UK. He went on to obtain a Doctor of Philosophy (PhD) degree in Manufacturing Systems, awarded by Cranfield University as well.

Career
Following the completion of his graduate studies, he worked as a research associate at the Institute for Manufacturing (IfM), in the School of Engineering at the University of Cambridge in the UK. He was then hired by the Uganda National Council for Higher Education (UNCHE), rising to the position of Head of Institutional and Programme Accreditation (IPA). On 3 October 2022, he was appointed as the substantive vice chancellor of MMU, becoming the first VC of the university, since it became a public institution.

Research 
He has also participated in academic research and he has some journal articles he has authored and co-authored; these include; Managing and leading African Universities. Development of an impact assessment framework for lean manufacturing within SMEs. and Higher education systems and institutions: Uganda.

See also
 List of universities in Uganda
 List of university leaders in Uganda
 John Massa Kasenene

References

External links
 Website of Mountains of he Moon University

Living people
Year of birth missing (living people)
Ugandan scientists
Alumni of the University of Hull
Alumni of Cranfield University
Alumni of Canterbury Christ Church University
People from Northern Region, Uganda
Ugandan expatriates in the United Kingdom
Vice-chancellors of universities in Uganda
Academic staff of the Mountains of the Moon University